Joanne Yatvin is an American public school educator. Formerly a president of the National Council of Teachers of English, she was a member of the National Reading Panel (1997-2000), mandated by the US Congress to assess different methods of literacy education. She published a "minority report" separately, saying that panel members lacked integrity. She taught at Portland State University.

Her research has included the study of the relation between speech manipulation and reading comprehension.

References

Portland State University faculty